Legend Rock Petroglyph Site is located in Hot Springs County, Wyoming, 20 miles northwest of Hot Springs State Park (which is located in Thermopolis, Wyoming). Legend Rock is a petroglyph site which features hundreds of individual petroglyphs spread across the face of the rock. Although a handful of the rock's etchings have variously been eroded and defaced, a wide majority have been preserved for public viewing. The nearly 300 individual petroglyphs feature some of the oldest and best examples of Dinwoody rock art in the world. The origins of the petroglyphs are still subject to debate.  The site was listed on the National Register of Historic Places on July 5, 1973 and it  is preserved by the state of Wyoming as a state historic site.

References

External links

 Legend Rock, Wyoming Division of State Parks and Historic Sites
 https://web.archive.org/web/20120324034208/http://wyoparks.state.wy.us/Site/SiteInfo.aspx?siteID=9 Hot Springs State Park], Wyoming Division of State Parks and Historic Sites
Numerous photos at Legend Rock, Numerous photos at Legend Rock
Portals to Other Realities: Legend Rock carries 10,000 years of profound beliefs at Wall Street Journal

Petroglyphs in Wyoming
Protected areas of Hot Springs County, Wyoming
Archaeological sites on the National Register of Historic Places in Wyoming
Wyoming state historic sites
National Register of Historic Places in Hot Springs County, Wyoming
IUCN Category III